Barry Wood (born 1950) is an Australian former rugby league footballer who played in the 1970s for Newtown, North Sydney and South Sydney in the NSWRL competition.  He is the father of former rugby league players Garth Wood and Nathan Wood.

Playing career
Wood began his first grade career with Newtown in 1970.  Wood spent four years at Newtown before joining South Sydney in 1974.  Wood spent 1 season with Souths and played at halfback in the club's 24-8 finals loss to Western Suburbs.  In 1975, Wood joined North Sydney and played 3 uneventful years at the club but did finish top try scorer in 1977 for the team.   In 1978, Wood rejoined Newtown and played 2 seasons for them with the club coming last in 1978 and second last in 1979.  Wood was not re-signed by Newtown for the 1980 season and then retired.

Post playing
Wood later became a trainer and associate to Kerry Packer and then became involved in his son Garth's boxing career.

References

1950 births
Living people
Australian rugby league players
Newtown Jets players
North Sydney Bears players
South Sydney Rabbitohs players
Rugby league halfbacks
Rugby league players from Sydney